Iwashita (written: 岩下 or 岩月) is a Japanese surname. Notable people with the surname include:

, Japanese sumo wrestler
, Japanese footballer
, Japanese footballer
, Japanese long-distance runner
, Japanese actress
, Japanese golfer

Japanese-language surnames